Moresby is a small village and civil parish in the Borough of Copeland in Cumbria, England.  It had a population of 1,280 at the 2001 census, increasing to 1,997 at the 2011 Census. Moresby sits on Cumbria's west coast. Moresby Hall is one of only three Grade I listed buildings in Copeland. The name of the hall and the village is thought to come from a family who settled in the area.

There was a Roman fort at Moresby, believed to have been called Gabrosentum, the perimeter banks of which can be seen in aerial photos and on the ground. St Bridget's Church is in the northeast corner of the fort site. The church and Moresby Hall lie on the west side of the A595, but most people live in Low Moresby on the east side, or Moresby Parks, a larger village south of Low Moresby.

Etymology
The " 'bȳ of Maurice'... a saint popular on the continent."
'Bȳ' is Old English from the Old Norse 'býr', meaning 'hamlet', 'village'.

Governance
An electoral ward in the same name exists. This ward is not the complete area of Moresby parish and at the 2011 Census had a population of 1,448.

See also

Listed buildings in Moresby, Cumbria

References

External links
Cumbria County History Trust: Moresby (nb: provisional research only - see Talk page)

Civil parishes in Cumbria
Borough of Copeland
Roman sites in Cumbria